Rarities is a 2003 album from Canadian singer-songwriter Ron Sexsmith.   It is a compilation of previously recorded but unreleased tracks as well as tracks that were released on international versions of his previous releases.

Track listing
All songs by Ron Sexsmith except where indicated below.
 "On a Whim" – 2:28
 "Almost Always" – 4:04
 "Good Old Desk" (Harry Nilsson) – 2:06
 "You Were There" – 3:04
 "Same Old Eyes" – 3:30
 "Tears Behind the Shades" – 2:36
 "Blade of Grass" – 2:49
 "Too Late" – 2:25
 "Words We Never Use" – 3:25
 "I Don't Like Mondays" (Bob Geldof) – 4:19
 "Before We Ever Met" – 3:43
 "A Kiss for Luck" – 4:08
 "All the Cherished Things" – 2:01
 "You Cross My Mind" – 3:08
 "Gold In Them Hills" (original duet version with Chris Martin) – 3:30
 "Someway, Somehow" – 2:59

2003 albums
Ron Sexsmith albums
Albums produced by Mitchell Froom
Albums produced by Tchad Blake